The 2012 IIHF Challenge Cup of Asia was the fifth IIHF Challenge Cup of Asia, an annual international ice hockey tournament held by the International Ice Hockey Federation (IIHF). It took place between 17 March and 25 March 2012 in Dehradun, India. The defending champions Hong Kong, who claimed their first title in 2011, did not send a team to this year's edition. Chinese Taipei, winners of the 2010 tournament competed after skipping the 2011 tournament. The United Arab Emirates won the tournament after defeating Thailand in the final and Malaysia finished in third after defeating Kuwait in the bronze medal match.

Overview
This will be the first IIHF sanctioned tournament to be held in India and will see the tournament expanded to seven teams.  The teams will be split into two seeded groups.  Group A will contain the United Arab Emirates, Thailand, Chinese Taipei and Kuwait, who will play a round robin format.  Group B will consist of Macau, Malaysia and India, who will play a double-round robin format.  The top two teams in Group A will receive a bye to the semi-finals, while the bottom two will play a semi-final qualification against the top two teams from Group B.

The United Arab Emirates won the tournament after defeating Thailand 3 – 0 in the final. It was the United Arab Emirates second title having previously won the 2009 IIHF Challenge Cup of Asia. Malaysia finished third after they defeated Kuwait in the bronze medal game. Loke Ban Kin finished the tournament as the top scorer after finishing with 27 points including 16 goals and 11 assists. The United Arab Emirate's Khaled al-Suwaidi finished as the tournaments top goaltender based on save percentage with a percentage of 100.

Group stage

Group A

All times local. (IST = UTC+5:30)

Group B

All times local. (IST = UTC+5:30)

Playoff round

Bracket

Qualification play-off

Semi-finals

Bronze medal game

Gold medal game

Ranking and statistics

Final standings

Scoring leaders
List shows the top ten skaters sorted by points, then goals, assists, and the lower penalties in minutes.

Leading goaltenders
Only the top goaltenders, based on save percentage, who have played at least 40% of their team's minutes are included in this list.

References

External links
International Ice Hockey Federation

Chal
IIHF Challenge Cups of Asia
International sports competitions hosted by India
Sport in Dehradun
2012 in Indian sport